James W. Lisanby (1928-2012) was a Rear Admiral in the United States Navy.

Background
Born in Caldwell County, Kentucky, Lisanby graduated the United States Naval Academy and earned graduate degrees from both the Massachusetts Institute of Technology and Harvard Business School.

Career
His final post was Deputy Commander for Acquisition and Logistics in the Naval Sea Systems Command.

Family
Lisanby was married for 61 years to Gladys Kemp Lisanby and had two daughters, Elizabeth Ann Lisanby and Dr. Sarah Lisanby.

His brother was designer Charles Alvin Lisanby  who had a seven decade career in the arts and entertainment industry, marked by 16 Emmy Award  nominations and three wins.

Legacy
The James and Gladys Kemp Lisanby Museum at James Madison University is named in honor of Admiral Lisanby and his wife.

References

United States Navy admirals
Massachusetts Institute of Technology alumni
United States Naval Academy alumni
Harvard Business School alumni
1928 births
2012 deaths